Gergis Teklemichael (alt. Giorgis) is the Minister of Trade and Industry of Eritrea.

References

Living people
Year of birth missing (living people)
People's Front for Democracy and Justice politicians
Government ministers of Eritrea